The Golden Dawn is a 1921 British silent crime film directed by Ralph Dewsbury and starring Gertrude McCoy, Warwick Ward and Frank Petley. An actress falls in love with a blind man.

Cast
 Gertrude McCoy as Nancy Brett 
 Warwick Ward as Dick Landon 
 Frank Petley as Henry Warville 
 Sydney Fairbrother as Mrs. Briggs 
 Mary Brough as Mrs. Powers 
 Philip Hewland as Inspector Martin 
 Charles Pelly as Charles Proctor 
 Charles Vane as Jim Briggs

References

Bibliography
 Low, Rachael. History of the British Film, 1918–1929. George Allen & Unwin, 1971.

1921 films
1921 crime films
British crime films
British silent feature films
Films directed by Ralph Dewsbury
Films set in England
British black-and-white films
1920s English-language films
1920s British films